Governor of Sarawak may refer to:
 Governors of the Crown Colony of Sarawak from 1946 to 1963
 Yang di-Pertua Negeri of Sarawak, the ceremonial head of state of Sarawak since 1963

Disambiguation pages